Palos, Illinois refers to a group of places in Cook County, Illinois, United States, south of Chicago. Two cities and one village within Palos Township along with the township constitute the group. The greater Palos area has a total population of 34,845.

Cities
 Palos Hills, Illinois, population: 17,484
 Palos Heights, Illinois, population: 12,515

Village
Palos Park, Illinois, population: 4,847